Norfolk Hotel may refer to:
Norfolk Hotel, Brighton, England
Norfolk Hotel, Fremantle, Australia
Norfolk Royale Hotel, England
Fairmont The Norfolk Hotel, Nairobi, Kenya, for most of its existence known simply as the Norfolk Hotel

See also
Hotel Norfolk, Norfolk, Nebraska